Gran Cañon Airport ,  is an airstrip serving Carrizal Bajo, a Pacific coastal village in the Atacama Region of Chile.

There is rising terrain east of the airstrip.

See also

Transport in Chile
List of airports in Chile

References

External links
OpenStreetMap - Gran Cañon
OurAirports - Gran Cañon
SkyVector - Gran Cañon
FallingRain - Gran Cañon Airport

Airports in Atacama Region